Tapinanthus bangwensis is a species of hemiparasitic plant in the family Loranthaceae, which is native to the tropics of western sub-Saharan Africa.

Range
It is native to the forest region from Senegal to Liberia and Sierra Leone.

Description
It is a woody aerial shrub that is attached to its host plant by haustoria. It has a pendulous stem of up to 2 meters long, and the branchlets are abundantly covered with brown lenticels.

The leaves are geographically variable in size and thickness. They are reduced in Senegal, but larger southwards. The perianth tube is red at the bottom, becoming pink in the middle, and grey at the lobes. The filaments and style are initially green, but turn purple.

Its tricolporate pollen grain is oblate-spheroidal and rather large (40 x 43.5 µm) with its amb a truncated triangle, not unlike that of T. cordifolius.

Host species
It parasitizes many plant species. These include Acacia farnesiana, A. nilotica, Alchornea cordifolia, Cola nitida, Coffea liberica, Crossopteryx, Croton, Machaerium, Manihot, Terminalia catappa and Theobroma.

Uses
In Ghana the leaves are used to treat guinea worm infection, while in Nigeria, the leaves are used to treat various disorders including cancer and liver ailments. In Senegal the plant is used with Gardenia tricantha (Rubiaceae) for the treatment of leprosy.

Flavonoids, lectins, polypeptides, triterpenes and polyphenolic compounds have been reported in the plant. Phlobotannins, alkaloids, anthraquinones, besides cardiac and steroidal glycosides have also been reported.

References

bangwensis
Taxa named by Adolf Engler
Flora of Africa